Lori Marino is the founder and executive director of The Kimmela Center for Animal Advocacy and founder and President of the Whale Sanctuary Project. She was formerly a senior lecturer at Emory University for 20 years and faculty affiliate at the Emory Center for Ethics. She is also a Creative Affiliate at the Safina Center.

Along with Diana Reiss, she co-authored the first study showing mirror self-recognition in bottlenose dolphins in 2001. She has been involved with work in dolphin and whale neuroanatomy for thirty years, showing that the brains of dolphins became as complex as those of great apes. through a different neuroanatomical route.  She has also been interviewed in the documentary Blackfish and the 2021 Netflix Documentary 'Seaspiracy'.

References

External links
The Whale Sanctuary Project
Inside the mind of a killer whale: A Q+A with the neuroscientist from ‘Blackfish’

American activists
Living people
Animal rights scholars
Sentientists
Year of birth missing (living people)